Agriocnemis kunjina  is a species of Australian damselfly in the family Coenagrionidae,
commonly known as a Pilbara wisp. 
It is a small damselfly, endemic to the Pilbara region in Western Australia,
where it inhabits still and flowing water.

Etymology
In 1969, Tony Watson named this species kunjina after Kunjina Spring in Hammersley Range, Western Australia, where specimens of this damselfly were collected.

Gallery

See also
 List of Odonata species of Australia

References 

Coenagrionidae
Odonata of Australia
Insects of Australia
Endemic fauna of Australia
Taxa named by J.A.L. (Tony) Watson
Insects described in 1969
Damselflies